Francis Itty Cora is a bestselling mystery novel in Malayalam by author T. D. Ramakrishnan.

Overview
The 2009 novel received considerable acclaims from critics for its unprecedented incorporation of many global historical characters and knowledge available to the present Malayalam readers for weaving the story line. Like The Journeyer the novel deals with the exploration of a merchant named Francis Itty Cora, hailing from the Kerala of 15th century. Among the historical characters include Vasco da Gama and Hypatia. The current global knowledge include Abu Ghraib torture and prisoner abuse and primacy of Kerala school of mathematics. Like The Da Vinci Code, this novel is of Christian background and tries to convince the reader an alternative possibility of what happened in the past in the Nazrani community of Malabar.

The English translation with the same title was released at the DC International Book Fair and Cultural on 5 March 2014.

References

2009 Indian novels
Malayalam novels
Indian thriller novels
Indian mystery novels
Family saga novels
Novels set in Kerala
Indian historical novels
DC Books books
Indian historical novels in Malayalam